Vancouver's (British Columbia, Canada) LGBT community is centered on Davie Village. Historically, LGBT people have also gathered in the Chinatown and Gastown neighborhoods. Former establishments include Dino's Turkish Baths, a gay bathhouse on Hastings, and the city's first drag bar, BJ's, on Pender Street.

Community centres
Qmunity, founded in 1979 as the Vancouver Gay Community Centre and formerly known as The Centre, is located on Bute Street in Davie Village.

Events

LGBT events in Vancouver include:

 Pride Week 1973
 Queer Arts Festival
 Vancouver Pride Festival, annual LGBTQ+ pride event
 Vancouver Queer Film Festival

The annual Gay Men's Health Summit is hosted by Vancouver's Community-Based Research Centre for Gay Men's Health (CBRC).

Media
Xtra Vancouver was a gay bi-weekly newspaper, published by Pink Triangle Press between 1993 and 2015.

Bars and nightclubs

LGBT bars and nightclubs in Vancouver include Celebrities Nightclub, Fountainhead Pub, The Junction, and Numbers, and Pumpjack Pub.

Organizations
LGBT organizations based in Vancouver include:

 BC Gay and Lesbian Archives
 Dancing to Eagle Spirit Society
 Gay Alliance Toward Equality
 Greater Vancouver Native Cultural Society (GVNCS Two-Spirit Society)
 Kiss and Tell collective
 Our City of Colours
 Pinoy Pride Vancouver
 Q Hall of Fame Canada
 Rainbow Refugee
 Salaam Vancouver
 Sher Vancouver
 Trikone Vancouver 
 Vancouver Gay Liberation Front
 Vancouver Pride Society
 Yad b’Yad LGBTQ

References

External links